Frode Alfson Bjørdal is philosophy professor emeritus at the University of Oslo, Norway.

Education 

Bjørdal did his undergraduate studies in philosophy, logic, mathematics and economics at the University of Bergen, Norway, and was a DAAD-Stipendiat at the Johan Wolfgang von Goethe Universität in Frankfurt am Main, Germany, in 1985/86. He studied philosophy at University of California, Santa Barbara, United States, from 1988 to 1992, and got his PhD from there in 1993.

Career 
From 1992 to 1994 he worked at the University of Trondheim (now Norwegian University of Science and Technology), and from 1994 to 1996 at the University of Tromsø. He worked  at the University of Oslo from 1996 to 2013, and is now a professor emeritus there.

Some philosophical publication areas 
Bjørdal has published on alternative set theories, semantics for modal logics and on modal ontological arguments in the Gödelian tradition.

Mathematical genealogy, and mathematical reviews 

Although a philosopher by training, his work earned him an entry in the Mathematics Genealogy Project.
Eight of his publications are reported upon in Mathematical Reviews; he has written ten article appraisals there, as per the references.

Selected works 
 Understanding Gödel's Ontological Argument, in T. Childers (ed.), The Logica Yearbook 1998, FILOSOFIA, Prague, 1999, 214-217.
 Considerations Contra Cantorianism, in M. Pelis & V. Puncochar (eds), The Logica Yearbook 2010, pp. 43–52, College Publications 2011.
 Librationist Closures of the Paradoxes, in Logic and Logical Philosophy, Vol. 21, No. 4 (2012), 323–361.
 The Evaluation Semantics – A Short Introduction, in M. Pelis & V. Puncochar (eds), The Logica Yearbook 2011, pp. 31–36, College Publications 2012.
 The inadequacy of a proposed paraconsistent set theory, Review of Symbolic Logic 4 (1):106-108, 2011.
 The Isolation of the Definable Real Numbers with Domination and Capture in Librationist Set Theory, lecture at Third St.Petersburg Days of Logic and Computability, Russia, August 24–26, 2015.
 Review of Penelope Rush (ed.), The Metaphysics of Logic, Cambridge University Press, 2014, 267pp., $99.00 (hbk), ISBN 9781107039643. in Notre Dame Philosophical Reviews
 Cubes and Hypercubes of Opposition, with Ethical Ruminations on Inviolability, in Logica Universalis Volume 10, Issue 2–3 (2016), pp 373–376.
 Elements of Librationism at arXiv:1407.3877.
 Skolem Satisfied - On £ and ₽, in Logic Around the World, Andisheh & Farhang-e Javidan, Iran, 2017, 31-42.
 All Properties are Divine or God Exists – The Sacred Thesis and its Ontological Argument, in Logic and Logical Philosophy, Vol 27, No 3 (2018), pp. 329–350.
 Reviews for Mathematical Reviews

Video of lecture for the Faculty of Arts - Al Mustansiriyah University - Baghdad, Iraq 

https://www.youtube.com/watch?v=kPDPaQOH884

References

External links 
 Home page at the University of Oslo
 Orcid
 Cristin - Current Research Information System in Norway
 Curriculo Lattes - At the National Council for Scientific and Technological Development in Brasil

1960 births
Living people
University of Bergen alumni
University of California, Santa Barbara alumni
Academic staff of the University of Oslo
Norwegian philosophers